Rt. Hon. Obinna Chidoka (born January 7, 1974) is an indigene of Obosi, Idemili North Local Government Area of Anambra State. He is a sociology graduate of the University of Lagos and an Honourable member of the House of Representatives representing Idemili North and Idemili South Federal Constituency in the 8th Nigerian National Assembly. He is the Chairman of the House Committee on Environment and Habitat.

Chidoka was the youngest member of the House of Representatives in the 6th Assembly where he had his first stint from June 2007 – July 2008 (a period of 13 months) during which he sponsored several bills and motions.

House Committee Membership 
In addition to being the chairman, House Committee on Environment and Habitat, he is a member of House Committees on Aviation, Constituency Outreach, Industry, Petroleum (Downstream), Youth and Social Development, Culture & Tourism and Local Content in the 8th Assembly.

See also
 List of members of the House of Representatives of Nigeria, 2015–2019

References

1974 births
Living people
21st-century Nigerian politicians
University of Lagos alumni
Peoples Democratic Party members of the House of Representatives (Nigeria)
People from Anambra State